Strabane Cricket Club is a cricket club in Strabane, County Tyrone, Northern Ireland, playing in North West Premiership.

The club was founded in 1883, and merged with Strabane Rovers in 1903.

Honours
Irish Senior Cup: 1
1998
Ulster Cup: 1
2005
North West Senior League: 15(1 shared)
1910, 1912, 1931, 1932, 1934, 1935, 1939, 1941, 1943, 1959, 1966, 1968, 2009 (shared), 2010, 2014
North West Senior Cup: 10
1903, 1912, 1925, 1936, 1937, 1938, 1941, 1966, 1987, 1993

References

External links

Cricket clubs in Northern Ireland
North West Senior League members
1883 establishments in Ireland
Strabane
Cricket clubs in County Tyrone